

Lac des Brenets (Swiss name) or Lac de Chaillexon (French name) is a lake on the river Doubs on the border of Switzerland and France.

Characteristics

The depression in which the lake lies was formed by the movements of a glacier, while the lake itself was formed by a natural barrier around 12,000 years ago. At the downstream end is a waterfall known as the Saut du Doubs. A few hundred metres away, a bridge connects the French and Swiss sides of the lake.

The lake was effectively dried out completely during the European drought of 2022, causing all ship operations to cease.

Photographs

See also
 List of lakes of Switzerland

References

External links

 Waterlevels of Lac des Brenets at Les Brenets

Lakes of Switzerland
Lakes of Doubs
Lakes of the canton of Neuchâtel
Lac Des Brenets
International lakes of Europe
LBrenets